Bruno Pizzul  (born 8 March 1938) is an Italian journalist and a former professional football player. He is best known for being the TV commentator of matches involving the Italy national football team from 1986 to 2002.

Biography and career
Born in Udine, he started his footballer career in an amateur club of Cormonese Cormons, a town in the Province of Gorizia. From the end of the 1950s to the beginnings of the 1960s he played as a professional midfielder for Pro Gorizia, Catania, Ischia and Cremonese.

Graduated in jurisprudence, in 1969 he was hired in RAI, the Italian public service broadcaster, as sports commentator. The first match commented was Juventus–Bologna of 1969–70 Coppa Italia and the first international match was the UEFA Euro 1972 Final (USSR–West Germany).

He kept this role until 21 August 2002, when he commented his last match of Italy, in a friendly against Slovenia, played in Trieste and lost by the Azzurri 0–1. After his official leave-taking from RAI, in 2007 Pizzul commented for La 7 the replicas of Italian matches at 2006 FIFA World Cup and several matches of 2007–08 Coppa Italia.

He considers himself Roman Catholic. On 2 June 2022 he was awarded the title of Commander of the Order of Merit of the Italian Republic.

Cinema
Bruno Pizzul played the role of himself in the Italian 1974 film L'arbitro,  directed by Luigi Filippo D'Amico, with Lando Buzzanca and Joan Collins.

In 1996, he lent his voice in the final scenes of the film Fantozzi - Il ritorno, directed by Neri Parenti, with Paolo Villaggio.

References

External links

 

1938 births
Italian sports journalists
Italian sports commentators
Sportspeople from Udine
Catania S.S.D. players
U.S. Cremonese players
Living people
Italian footballers
S.S. Ischia Isolaverde players
Association football midfielders
A.S. Pro Gorizia players
Footballers from Friuli Venezia Giulia
Commanders of the Order of Merit of the Italian Republic
Italian Roman Catholics